is a Japanese former ski jumper. He competed in the Sarajevo Winter Olympics at the age of 20.

References

External links

Japanese male ski jumpers
Olympic ski jumpers of Japan
Ski jumpers at the 1984 Winter Olympics
1963 births
Living people